Lionel Ming-shuan Ni (born December 13, 1951), is serving as the provost of the Hong Kong University of Science and Technology and concurrently the Chair Professor of Computer Science and Engineering. Prior that, he was the vice rector (academic affairs) at the University of Macau (UM) from January 2015 to 2019. Before joining UM, he was also the Chair Professor in the Computer Science and Engineering Department at the Hong Kong University of Science and Technology (HKUST), where he now returns to.

Before going to HKUST in 2002, he had spent more than 2 decades since 1981 as a full Professor in computer science and engineering at Michigan State University after he obtained his Ph.D. degree in 1980. During his stay, he served as the program director of the United States National Science Foundation Microelectronic Systems Architecture Program, directed 54 Ph.D. students and published numerous papers in pervasive computing, mobile computing, big data, sensor networks, parallel architectures, etc. He was elevated to the rank of a Fellow of the Institute of Electrical and Electronics Engineers in 1994 for his contribution to parallel processing and distributed systems. He owned 8 patents whilst more than 18 pending. His research papers were cited for more than 32000 times as of January 2019.

Footnotes

References

National Taiwan University alumni
Fellow Members of the IEEE
Living people
1951 births